Mad About the Man is a 1958 album by jazz singer Carmen McRae, arranged by Jack Pleis, of songs written by Noël Coward.

Reception

Allmusic awarded the album four stars and reviewer Jason Ankeny wrote that the combination of McRae and Coward was a "perfect match, bringing together two witty, sophisticated talents capable of remarkable expressions of raw emotional power." Ankeny also wrote that McRae was "at the absolute top of her game" and interpreted the songs with "effortless style and grace."

Track listing
 "I'll See You Again" - 2:42
 "Zigeuner" - 2:41
 "Some Day I'll Find You" - 2:57
 "Room with a View" - 2:45
 "World Weary" - 2:56
 "I Can't Do Anything at All" - 3:00
 "Mad About the Boy" - 4:11
 "Poor Little Rich Girl" - 3:04
 "I'll Follow My Secret Heart" - 2:45
 "If Love Were All" - 2:51
 "Why Does Love Get in the Way?" - 2:35
 "Never Again" - 2:49

All songs written by Noël Coward.

Personnel
Carmen McRae - vocals
Jack Pleis - arranger
Charlie Shavers - trumpet
Ike Isaacs - double bass
Ray Bryant - piano
Specs Wright - drums

References

1958 albums
Albums arranged by Jack Pleis
Carmen McRae albums
Decca Records albums
Noël Coward tribute albums